Tope 
may refer to:

People 
 Tantya Tope, an Indian leader in the Indian Rebellion of 1857
 Graham Tope, a Liberal Democrat politician in the UK
 Mato-tope (1795–1837), Native American chief
 Tope Alabi (born 1970), Nigerian gospel singer
 Tope Obadeyi (born 1989), footballer
 Joanna Tope, Scottish actress
 Tope Ademiluyi (born 1965), Nigerian politician
 Tope (film), a Bengali film

Other uses 
 Tope, an alternative term for stupa (a mound-like or hemispherical structure containing relics)
 Topé, a professional wrestling manoeuvre
 Tope shark or school shark, Galeorhinus galeus, a hound shark of the family Triakidae

See also 
 Taupe - a brown/grey colour

Disambiguation pages with given-name-holder lists
Disambiguation pages with surname-holder lists